Digital inclusion involves the activities necessary to ensure equitable access to and use of information and communication technologies for participation in social and economic life including for education, social services, health, social and community participation. Digital inclusion includes access to affordable broadband Internet services, Internet-enabled devices, access to digital literacy training, quality technical support, and applications and online content designed to enable and encourage self-sufficiency, participation, and collaboration. Related concepts include digital divide, digital exclusion and digital inequality however digital inclusion focuses more on the strategies, policies and programs required to address the digital divide.

As many services have moved online and with the increasing use of telehealth to deliver primary care, particularly during the COVID-19 pandemic in 2020, digital inclusion, including digital literacy and internet access is increasingly regarded as a social determinant of health.

Background 
With the increasing use of computers and the Internet in the 1990s and early 2000s concerns rose around digital equality, however this primarily focused on the physical access to technology. This gave rise to the concept of the digital divide which was originally developed to describe the growing disparity in Internet access between rural and urban areas of the United States of America. This gradually expanded to considerations of digital access between countries in what is termed the global digital divide, which mirrors many of the disparities seen within countries but on an international scale. However with the adoption of digital technologies across most sectors of society, and the increasing diversity of technologies and programs, access and use of ICT became more complex and essential for many aspects of daily life. This led to new terminology and a second wave of research on digital inequality which has been identified as the (1) usage gap, (2) second level digital divide, (3) emerging digital differentiation, and (4) digital inclusion.

Strategies for digital inclusion 
A review of the literature in 2019 found that while physical access to digital technologies and the internet continues to be a barrier to digital inclusion, digital ability and attitude were also potential barriers. Key strategies identified for improving digital inclusion are social support, direct user experience and collaborative learning/design.

Education is a key aspect of digital inclusion as digital technologies have become a key means of engaging with all levels of the education system, requiring levels of digital competence for successful engagement with the curriculum. In addition lifelong learning is required as technologies, services and systems are changing constantly. Public libraries and community service providers play a key role in supporting digital inclusion through access to computers, internet connection and expertise and training. Designing for digital inclusion may also help with poor written literacy, which remains a barrier for 10% of the world's population. UNESCO has developed Guidelines for designing digital technologies in ways that could assist those who are illiterate.

Indigenous digital inclusion 
Digital inclusion is a critical issue for many Indigenous communities across the globe, many of whom lack access to adequate resources.

The Australian Government has set a National Closing the Gap target for Aboriginal and Torres Strait Islander people to have equal levels of digital inclusion by 2026.

Measuring digital inclusion 
The Australian Digital Inclusion Index (ADII) is a research project which has been tracking digital inclusion throughout Australia since 2016. It uses survey data to measure digital inclusion across three dimensions of access, affordability and digital ability.

The Future of Digital Inclusion 
On February 16th, 2021, a global dialogue within the United Nations (UN) took a look at the future of digital inclusion. Through the adoption of the 2030 UN Agenda for Sustainable Development, Member States made a commitment. They pledged to "leave no one behind."

By 2030, the UN's goal is to close the digital divide by providing access to the Internet and mobile technologies for all nations and peoples and for all segments of society.

The UN sees the crisis of too many people in our global society still living unconnected and how the digital divide remains a challenge that must be addressed.

Digital inclusion advocacy groups 
Australian Digital Inclusion Alliance

National Digital Inclusion Alliance (US)

References 

Internet
Digital media